Ek Khiladi Ek Haseena (translation: One Player, One Beauty) is a 2005 Indian Hindi-language crime thriller film directed by Suparn Verma. It is a remake of the 2003 Hollywood crime drama movie Confidence. This movie was another movie in which the father-son duo Fardeen Khan and Feroz Khan had worked. Before this, they had worked in the 2003 movie, Janasheen. This movie was the first lead role for actress Koena Mitra, who was previously seen in small roles.

Plot 
Ek Khiladi Ek Haseena focuses on the duo of Arjun Verma (Fardeen Khan) and his best friend Rohit Kapoor (Rohit Roy) who con people for a living.

During their latest of escapades, the duo manages to con the rich accountant of a don by the name of Sikander (Gulshan Grover), resulting in them stealing millions of rupees. Soon after, Rohit (Rohit Roy) is killed by Kharbu's men and Arjun escapes to another city. Kharbu manages to track him down and orders him to pay up the stolen sum plus interest or face Sikander's retirement plan.

To get his hands on the millions, Arjun sets up a special team who will help him execute the plan. Also involved in the team is Natasha Kapoor (Koena Mitra), a psychiatrist who ends up being conned by the group but eventually succeeds in seeking revenge. 

Thrown into this mix is another character by the name of Jehangir Khan (Feroz Khan), who slows down Arjun's plans to get his hands on the money.

But later it is shown that it was the plan of Arjun to seek the revenge of the death of Rohit as Sikander is arrested by police in drugs case. The film ends with Arjun going with friends and his lover Natasha with the Jahangir money.

Cast 
 Fardeen Khan as Arjun Verma
 Koena Mitra as Dr. Natasha Kapoor, Psychiatrist
 Rohit Roy as Rohit Kapoor
 Feroz Khan as Jahangir Khan, Businessman 
 Kay Kay Menon as Kaif 
 Gulshan Grover as Sikander
 Kurush Deboo as Chipu / Sunny Dastur
 Amin Hajee as Jack
 Mukul Dev as Bhatia 
 Daya Shankar Pandey as Inspector Sharma
 Rajesh Vivek as Inspector D'Souza
 Makrand Deshpande as G. Singh
 Murali Sharma as Jai Patel
 Sharad Kapoor as CBI Inspector Sardesai / Vijay Kapoor, Pune Crime Branch
 Mumaith Khan as Harsh noida wala Appearance (Song)
 Rakhi Sawant as Special Appearance (Song)
 Zabyn Khan as Special Appearance (Song)

Themes and influences
According to Verma, the film is "a remake of every con film ever made, every real con you've ever read about. It's imbibed from everything I've ever seen."

The film's opening in reverse, where the coin goes into the palm, was a homage to Memento. He also paid homage to Harpo Marx through Amin Hajee's character, who whistles throughout the film and doesn't talk. He compared Fardeen Khan's character to the French actor Alain Delon as seen in Jean-Pierre Melville's Le Cercle Rouge and Le Samourai, and called him the Amitabh Bachchan for the present century.

When questioned if the film is a rip=off of the American film Confidence as pointed out by many people, Verma explained that while there were mentions of the film being copied from Confidence, The Sting, and even Criminal, he just thought  there were moments from a lot of films. He admitted there were certain similarities in the second half, but also claimed the film was not a rip-off but an amalgamation of several films he had loved.

Soundtrack

The music is composed by Pritam while the Lyrics are penned by Shabbir Ahmed, Amitabh Verma, Dev Kohli, Subrat Sinha and Mayur Puri.

Track listing

References

External links 
 
 

2005 films
2000s Hindi-language films
Films featuring songs by Pritam
Indian crime thriller films
2000s business films
2005 crime thriller films
Films about con artists
Indian remakes of American films